Old Israel may refer to:
 the history of ancient Israel and Judah
 Staroizrail, a sect of 19th century Russian Spiritual Christianity